Rejowiec Fabryczny is a town in Poland, in Lublin Voivodeship, in Chełm County. It has 4,419 inhabitants (2016). Rejowiec Fabryczny is a rail junction, located on the main Warsaw - Lublin - Chełm connection. Also, another line originates in Rejowiec Fabryczny, which goes southwards to Zamość.

History
First settlements located in what now is Rejowiec Fabryczny were mentioned in the 13th century document, when this area belonged to Kingdom of Galicia–Volhynia. In the mid-14th century, the region of Chelm was annexed by Poland. For centuries, a folwark existed here, which belonged to several szlachta families, such as the Rejs and the Wojakowskis. In March 1876, when Rejowiec Fabryczny was part of Russian-controlled Congress Poland (see Partitions of Poland), Krzysztof Morawski built here a manor house, surrounded by a park.

In 1878, the area of today’s Rejowiec Fabryczny was purchased by Society of the Vistula River Railroad, which in 1879–1880 built here a rail station. In 1914, Society of Lublin Portland Factory began construction of a cement plant. Due to World War I, the plant was not finished until 1924. Furthermore, two apartment blocks for workers were built in the Morawinek district.

The plant was expanded in 1951–1955, after which it produced 700,000 tons of cement annually. Following Communist custom, it was named “Peace”, and additional flats were added, which gave Rejowiec Fabryczny the status of osiedle. Finally, on July 22, 1962 (the anniversary of the PKWN Manifesto, Rejowiec Fabryczny was granted town charter. In the 1960s and 1970s the newly established town quickly developed. New buildings were added and its population grew.

Notable people
 
 
Marcin Firlej (born 1975), Polish journalist, writer and war correspondent

References

Cities and towns in Lublin Voivodeship
Chełm County
Kholm Governorate
Lublin Voivodeship (1919–1939)